The Greensboro Prowlers were a professional arena football team based in Greensboro, North Carolina. The Prowlers competed in the AF2, as a member of the league's American Conference Atlantic Division. The franchise that was one of the league's charter members. The Prowlers had three mediocre seasons before finally getting a decent winning record in their final year. Since it was not enough to save the franchise, the Prowlers eventually folded following the 2003 season.

Season-by-season 

|-
|2000 || 3 || 13 || 0 || 8th AC || --
|-
|2001 || 5 || 11 || 0 || 6th AC Northeastern || --
|-
|2002 || 3 || 13 || 0 || 5th AC Atlantic || --
|-
|2003 || 9 || 7 || 0 || 2nd AC Atlantic || --
|-
!Totals || 20 || 44 || 0
|colspan="2"|
|}

External links
 Greensboro Prowlers on ArenaFan.com

American football teams in North Carolina
Defunct af2 teams
Sports in Greensboro, North Carolina
American football teams established in 1999
American football teams disestablished in 2003
1999 establishments in North Carolina
2003 disestablishments in North Carolina